John Knight Reid (1907 – April 22, 1965) was a Canadian curler. He was a member of 1947 Brier Champion team (skipped by Jimmy Welsh), playing as second, representing Manitoba. A member of the Deer Lodge Curling Club in Winnipeg, he was also a three-time provincial champion. He retired in 1958, and died in 1965.

References

Brier champions
1907 births
1965 deaths
Curlers from Manitoba
British emigrants to Canada
Canadian male curlers